Occidental Mindoro, officially the Province of Occidental Mindoro, is a province in the Philippines located in the Mimaropa region. The province occupies the western half of the island of Mindoro. Its capital is Mamburao, but the largest municipality is San Jose. As of 2020, Occidental Mindoro has 525,354 inhabitants.

The province is bordered on the east by the province of Oriental Mindoro, and on the south by the Mindoro Strait. The South China Sea is to the west of the province and Palawan is located to the southwest, across the Mindoro Strait. Batangas is to the north, separated by the Verde Island Passage, a protected marine area and the center of the center of the world's marine biodiversity.

History
Mindoro Island was originally known to the ancients as Ma-i. It was formally called Mait, and known to the Chinese traders before the coming of the Spanish. Its existence was mentioned in the old Chinese chronicles in 775 A.D. and more elaborately in 1225. It was a major anchorage in the Southeast Asia trade route during the pre-Philippines period. Chinese, Arab and Indian merchants traded with the natives. In 1570, the Spanish began to explore the island and named it Mina de Oro ("mine of gold") after finding some of the precious metal, though no major gold discoveries were ever made.

The natives of Mindoro were called Manguianes by the Spaniards. But the natives refer to themselves by their ethnic or clan identification. There were seven such ethnic or clan distinctions, which are differentiated by language and areas where each can be found.

The Mangyans, as they are now anthropologically known, do not have a warrior society. They are a peaceful, shy but friendly people. They are rarely known to be hostile, and have had no significant record of violent conflict with other people in the entire history of the province. They grow root crops in forest clearings (slash and burn farms), and hunt wild animals in the forest for their meat needs.

There are no authentic documents in existence explaining the original stock of the Mangyan people, but later theoreticians postulate that they migrated from Indonesia before 775 A.D. They hopped from island to island, until finally settling down permanently in Mindoro. It appeared that clan settlements existed in the North as well as in the southern ends of the island. By 779, the southwest coast of the island was already a known trading center, and its fine natural harbor frequented by Arab, Indian and Chinese maritime traders who plied the route. But there was no attempt of subjugation, just trading.

The first semblance of a political system in Mindoro's experience was provided by China in the 13th century. Chinese imperial forces under Admiral Cheng Ho with a powerful armada of 60 war junks visited Mindoro and other parts of the archipelago in the 13th century, with the purpose of gaining more trading favors for Chinese merchants.

For a time, Admiral Ho tried to exert some effort of rule as a prelude to Sino annexation. Internal trouble in the Chinese home front, however, recalled the armada, and the attempts of the empire to annex the archipelago did not materialize.

Some time after the Ho overture, Islamic influence reached the island, probably, through Suluanons who traded with the natives. Moslem peoples, possibly - Orang Dampuans (economic refugees from Sulu) crossed Mindoro Strait from Paragua (now Palawan) and settled along the coastal areas, developing progressive maritime communities.

In 1572, Captain Juan de Salcedo of the Spanish expeditionary army set sail from Cebu and explored the west coast of the island, encountering the Mangyans, who appeared used to seeing foreigners and were not at all a bit surprised at their arrival. On the contrary, it was Salcedo and Martin de Goiti who were surprised to see cross designs on the clothing and basketwork of the natives, and thought some early Christian missionary had been there before them. But later scholars believed the design was Indic in origin and had no religious meaning.

The Spaniards also encountered Moro settlers in Lubang Island that were vassals of and paid tribute to the kingdom of Maynila in the North, under Rajah Sulayman. This was the first real political system in the island. The Moros, who apparently had heard of the invaders from their kinsmen in the south, engaged the small Spanish force who landed on their shore, but the Spaniards' arquebuses and cannon fire from the ships hoved-to broadside to the island took the field. The Moros fled to the hills, and Salcedo burned their village.

After the defeat of Sulaiman in the same year, Mindoro and other vassal states of Maynila became subject of Castillan rule. The island was officially referred to from then on as Mina de Oro (Mine of Gold), compressed later on into Mindoro. The free land name, Ma-i, fell into disuse. The Spanish-Moro war would rage on in Mindoro until toward the end of the Spanish regime in the 19th century.

In 1602, Moro forces plundered the most important Spanish towns along the coasts of Mindoro and Southern Luzon, and subsequently reestablished their hold in Mindoro by constructing a fort at Mamburao. From 1720 onwards, Moro raids became devastating not only to the island's Hispanized communities but to other parts of the archipelago as well.

In 1757, the Moros, more particularly, the Iranuns (a relative of the Maranaws of the Lake Lanao regions) organized a war fleet of 74 fast native ships called prahus.  They destroyed several settlements in the island, carrying off their inhabitants to be sold as slaves in Jolo.

The fact that a Moro fort at Mamburao threatened Manila, the capital of the colonial government, embarrassed the conquerors in the eyes of their native subjects, which was politically intolerable to the Spanish administrators. So in 1766, the Spaniards gathered a large force of 1,200 marines, augmented by a large army of native mercenaries, and burned the Iranun fort. But the Moros simply faded into the hills to escape, and came back when the counter-raid was over and the raiders returned to Manila.

The Moros not only plundered goods, but also took prisoners of war which they sold as slaves. Many Islamic leaders in Mindanao, in spite of the peace settlement with the Spaniards contained in treaties and formal agreements, supported piratical raids with arms, ammunition and food, not only because it was a patriotic act (defending Moroland), but this patriotism was also giving them handsome profits. They received part of the "prisoners of war" when a successful raider returned, which earned them huge amounts.

Most of the raids were successful because of the fast watercraft in the employ of the raiders. It was not until the commission of the vapor, fast steamships, in the mid-18th century that the Spanish navy successfully patrolled the archipelagic waters, and fared well against the wind-powered native seacraft of the pirates. Many pirate fleets were sunk at sea, or confined to their hiding places.

The invention of machines during the Industrial Revolution, which gradually replaced manual labor, and the consecutive abolitions of slave ownership in many liberalized countries, caused a great decline in the demand for slave labor. Many of the pirate markets closed, and prices fell severely for captives.

With losses to the Spanish navy increasing, and the eventual fall in profits from slave selling, raiding became less appealing to the Iranuns and their Islamic supporters. Uneconomical patriotism simply did not make quite an appeal. Thus, it came to pass that the Moro pirates faded from Mindoro's history. The pirate fort in Mamburao was abandoned, and the Moros retreated to Mindanao to consolidate their forces and continue the Moslem resistance at the homefront. Mindoro Island then became a Spanish possession in a truer sense for the first time. But not for long.

In 1896, the Philippine Revolution begun, which spread throughout the islands. In 1897, the Spaniards posted a rifle company of 140 troops and 51 marines to Calapan to secure the island from the forces of General Emilio Aguinaldo and his revolutionary army, then beginning to overrun Spanish positions in the archipelago. Only Mindoro was relatively safe. In 1898, the revolutionaries attacked and overwhelmed the settlement that is now Bongabong. The revolution also ignited in the western part (Occidental Mindoro), which seized control of the settlements there from the Spaniards. Finally, they marched against the capital of Calapan with some 1,000 ill-armed foot soldiers.

The attack came to nothing. The Spanish defenses held. It was only the arrival of 1,000 regular army troops with artillery, all under the command of General Malvar in Batangas, that compelled the surrender of the Spaniards under Governor Morales. Hence on July 1, 1898, the Spanish rule in Mindoro Island, lasting for 328 years, ended.

A new battalion "Mindoro", with two rifle companies, was formed under the command of Captain Ruperto Hernandez and Estanislao Cayton, both from Batangas. The revolutionary political reins were held by the elite, who also held the same reins under the Spaniards (and later under the Americans). The revolution, therefore, was for liberation against colonial rule but not a war for social change, which was to be defeated late in the US-Filipino war that followed.

In the same year, the boldly developing community of sugar cane planters, mill workers, company professionals and businessmen enabled the creation of San Jose as an official Philippine town.

In 1950, the province of Mindoro was divided into Oriental Mindoro and Occidental Mindoro by virtue of Republic Act No. 505.

Geography

Occidental Mindoro covers a total area of  occupying the western section of the Mindoro island, and includes outlying islands in the northwest.

General land surface features that characterize Occidental Mindoro are mountains, rivers, hills, valleys, wide plains and some small fresh water lakes. The taller mountains can be found in the interior that it shares with Oriental Mindoro. 
Mountain ranges converge on the two central peaks, Mount Halcon in the north, and Mount Baco in the south. There is also a mountain known as bundok ng susong dalaga, the "Maiden's breast mountain", that looks like a reclined woman.

The northern part of the province has relatively fewer plains, while the southern parts have wider flatlands. Most of the plains are cultivated fields, with few remaining untouched forests. Significant hilly areas can be found rolling off in Santa Cruz in the north, and in San Jose and Magsaysay in the south. These are grassed-over rather than forested.

There are several major drainage or river systems flowing on a generally westerly course: Mamburao River, Pagbahan, Mompong, Biga, Lumintao, Busuanga and Caguray. Swamp areas are restricted to the south, specially, along the river mouths.

The province is also home to one of the most popular coral reefs in the Philippines, Apo Reef.

Climate
Occidental Mindoro has two distinct weather types: rainy season and dry season. Rains begin to fall in the province in late May, intensifying through June, July, August, September and October, then gradually subsides in November. The months of August and September are the wettest period, with storms directly passing through the area.

On the other hand, dry season starts in November, with rainfall subsiding in intensity, and altogether ceasing in January, February, March and April. March and April are the driest period, with cloudless skies and parched earth characterizing the general area.

Administrative divisions
Occidental Mindoro comprises 11 municipalities and 2 legislative districts.

Demographics

Major languages spoken are Tagalog and the Mangyan languages. Ilokano, Visayan,  and Bikolano, are spoken by people who migrated from the provinces where they are spoken. Occidental Mindoro is a cultural melting pot, populated mostly by recent immigrants.

The indigenous people in the province are the Mangyans (Manguianes in Spanish, Mañguianes in Old Tagalog), consisting of 7 distinct tribes. They occupy the foothills and interior. The Mangyan have inhabited the island since pre-history. They are believed to have originally traveled from Indonesia and settled down for good in the island.

There is much evidence, historical and geophysical, that the Mangyan tribes formerly lived near the coastlines. They were compelled, however, to move into the interior jungles of the island when the inter-island immigrants came, in order to avoid confrontations, which the peace-loving tribes wished to avoid at all costs. They also wished to avoid cultural changes and to preserve their way of life.

Today, the Mangyan number to only around 80,000 (freely moving in and out in both provinces of Oriental and Occidental Mindoro).  But there is no accurate accounting of them since many still live elusively in the upper regions of the island, avoiding contact with lowlanders.

Religion
Like the Eastern half of the island, most of the population of Occidental Mindoro are of Roman Catholic conviction (82%) while minor religions are usually represented by various Christian denominations, Islam, indigenous Philippine folk religions, animism, and atheism.

Economy

Occidental Mindoro is an agricultural area devoted to the production of food. Its economic base is rice production (Oryza sativa culture), a Philippine staple crop. It is the leading activity and source of seasonal employment in the province, participated in by almost 80 per cent of the population, including children.

Wetland or lowland rice is a rainy season crop, heavily dependent on water and therefore produced from July (planting season) to October (harvest season). Tobacco, onions, garlic and vegetables are grown during the dry season (November to May) since they are not water-intensive crops, and require longer photoperiodicity.

Rice, corn, onions, garlic, salt, fishes (both wild and cultured) are some of the relatively significant surpluses produced in the province in exportable quantities. Mangoes, cashew nuts, cooking bananas (saba) and some other fruits grown in upland orchards are among the other exports of Occidental Mindoro that have traditionally contributed to its income. Peanuts are also grown in some parts of the province, as well as cassava, sweet potatoes, ginger and other minor cultivars.

Forest resources include timber and minerals, among them gold, copper, silver, chrome, and non-metallic minerals such as lime for making cement, and greenstones for ornaments. Timber groups include many species of hardwoods, such as mahogany, and other types of trees in high demand for durability.

There is no large industry in the province. The government is the biggest employer, absorbing most of the off-farm labor force. The local electric cooperative, Occidental Mindoro Electric Cooperative (OMECO), is the biggest employer in the private sector, with nearly 150 regular employees. The rest of the population is engaged in private trades.

Problems 
There are many multi-faceted problems in Occidental Mindoro's economy. In rice farming, the biggest issue confronting the producers is the high cost of production. This is attributed mainly to the spiraling prices of farm inputs. A study concluded that from 1997 to 2003, the cost of production rose by 47 per cent, while the income derived from marketing rice maintained 1997 levels. There are also confused reports that the average production rate has declined due to the reduced application of necessary farm chemicals. In street language, this means that the farmers simply cut the amount of inputs because they cannot afford the high capital requirements of following all the recommended inputs in the farming calendar.

Another structural problem is the inadequacy of irrigation. Most of the river systems in the province no longer have the demanded volume of water to make irrigation feasible. This is attributed to the greatly deforested watersheds.

Flora and fauna

References

External links

 
 
 Local Governance Performance Management System

 
Provinces of the Philippines
Mindoro
Provinces of Mimaropa
States and territories established in 1950
1950 establishments in the Philippines